The Bangalore–Chennai Expressway, or National Expressway 7 (NE-7), is an under construction  long, 8-lane wide access-controlled expressway between the cities of Bangalore, the capital of Karnataka and Chennai, the capital of Tamil Nadu. It will run from Hoskote in Bangalore Metropolitan Region Development Authority to Sriperumbudur in Chennai Metropolitan Area. It is planned to allow vehicles to reach . This expressway was designated as a National Expressway on 1 January 2021. The total project value is ₹ 16,730 crore. It will be completed by March 2024.

Prospects 
Realtors and companies are willing to invest in places near Walajapet (Banavara, Keezhveeranam), as these places have been marked as the next industrial hub. Japanese investors expressed interest in this road to link harbours. Japanese real estate companies such as Nippon Expressway Limited have conducted detailed studies on areas like Panniyur and Keezhveeranam village and encouraged investors to focus on these areas.

The National Highways Development Project (NHDP) Phase-VI has been established, following expectations of the new government's involvement, and before the real estate prices begin to rise along the expressways, mainly near Ranipet -Ponnapanthangal-Arakkonam (Tamil Nadu).

Many industrial hubs have planned to start up their next projects near Banavara, which already has a TVS brake manufacturing unit. Mahindra, Bajaj, and Nissan groups plan to start new plants in that area. The proposed New Chennai Greenfield International Airport in Parandur is also expected to be connected to the expressway.

Construction 
The NHAI has divided the construction work of 258 km long Bangalore–Chennai Expressway into 3 Phases with a total of 10 construction packages. It which will be executed simultaneously by 6 construction companies.

Phase-1

Phase-2

Phase-3

Extension 
The Indian National Expressway Network was proposed by the Ministry of Road, Transport and Highways (MoRTH). The Government of India envisioned a Bangalore–Mangalore Greenfield Expressway. A Mangaluru–Chennai Expressway through Bangalore has also been proposed.

Status updates
 Aug 2018: Land acquisition was announced to start soon.
 Dec 2018: ₹1,370 crores were already spent by the Government of India on pre-construction activities of this ₹17,930 crores expressway.
 Feb 2019: More than 60% of land required for 262 km expressway was now acquired. Work was announced to begin in six months. The deadline of the Expressway was set to 2023.
 Nov 2020: Acquisition of required 2,650 hectares of land was nearly done. Tenders were invited for 3 out of total 10 packages.
 Feb 2021: The expressway was later shortened to be 4 laned instead earlier planned 8 lanes. Dilip Buildcon Ltd declared lowest bidder for Package 1 (Hoskote - Malur) and Package 2 (Malur - Bangarapet).
Sep 2021: Dilip Buildcon Ltd receives Letter of Agreement (LoA) from National Highways Authority of India (NHAI) for construction of the expressway.
Jan 2023: The expressway will have 8 lanes only, and will be completed by March 2024.
Jan 2023: As of 26 January, around 15% work has been completed on the expressway.

See also
 Bangalore–Mysore Infrastructure Corridor
 Chittoor–Thatchur Expressway
 Expressways in India
 National Highways Development Project
 Delhi–Mumbai Expressway

References

Transport in Bangalore
Transport in Chennai
Expressways in Karnataka
Proposed expressways in India
Expressways in Tamil Nadu